Huhtiniemi is a neighborhood in the city of Lappeenranta in South-Eastern Finland. It is located 2 kilometers west of the town center on a cape of the same name, that extends into lake Saimaa in the North. The campus of the Lappeenranta University of Technology is located to the west of Huhtiniemi. The area now contains apartment buildings, camping grounds and student housing of the university.

The area housed a shooting range associated with the military barracks in Lappeenranta, until at least the mid 1970s.

Secret executions? 

According to persistent rumors alive since World War II, the area contains mass graves of deserters executed by secret and possibly illegal military tribunals in June 1944 after the Soviet Fourth strategic offensive.
The issue first gained publicity in 1971, when 10 bodies were found during construction work for a water mains.
New excavations were started in 2005, and a mass grave with 11 bodies was found in October 2006. The excavations will be ceased until the ground softens at spring 2007.

External links 
 LOAS student housing in Huhtiniemi
 Wartime mass grave of executed deserters could be unearthed in summer at Lappeenranta campsite, Helsingin Sanomat 5 March 2005

Lappeenranta
Geography of South Karelia